Michel Daignault (born June 25, 1966) is a Canadian short track speed skater who competed in the 1988 Winter Olympics and in the 1992 Winter Olympics. He is a two-time Overall World Champion, having won the titles in 1987 (shared) and 1989.

He was born in Montreal, Quebec and is the older brother of Laurent Daignault.

In 1988 he competed in the first short track speed skating events at the Olympics when this sport was a demonstration sport. He was a member of the Canadian relay team which finished third in the 5000 metre relay competition. He also finished third in the 3000 metres event and second in the 1000 metres contest.

In 1992 he was a member of the Canadian relay team which won the silver medal in the 5000 metre relay competition. In the 1000 m event he finished eighth.

External links
 
Michel Daignault at ISU
Michel Daignault at the-sports.org
 

1966 births
Living people
Canadian male short track speed skaters
Olympic short track speed skaters of Canada
Short track speed skaters at the 1988 Winter Olympics
Short track speed skaters at the 1992 Winter Olympics
Olympic silver medalists for Canada
Olympic medalists in short track speed skating
Medalists at the 1992 Winter Olympics
Speed skaters from Montreal
Universiade medalists in short track speed skating
Universiade bronze medalists for Canada
Competitors at the 1985 Winter Universiade